PIA Planetarium may refer to:

 PIA Planetarium, Karachi, Pakistan
 PIA Planetarium, Lahore, Pakistan
 PIA Planetarium, Peshawar, Pakistan